Edgar Nelson Rhodes,  (January 5, 1877 – March 15, 1942), was a Canadian parliamentarian from Nova Scotia who served as Premier of Nova Scotia from 1925 to 1930.

Early life and career
He was first elected to the House of Commons of Canada in 1908 as a member of the Conservative Party. In January 1917, he became Speaker of the House of Commons of Canada when his predecessor, Albert Sévigny, was appointed to the Canadian Cabinet. Rhodes was retained in the position following the 1917 election that fall, becoming the third Speaker since James Cockburn to preside over more than one Parliament. In 1921, he was made a member of the Queen's Privy Council for Canada before retiring from politics to become president of the British-American Nickel Company, whose previous president had been James Hamet Dunn.

Premiership
The company failed in 1925, and he returned to provincial politics. Prior to the 1925 provincial election, he was asked to become leader of the Nova Scotia Conservative Party after the leader of the party, W. L. Hall, was assaulted on the waterfront. Rhodes took over the party and led it to victory in the 1925 election. The Conservatives defeated a Liberal government that had been in power for forty-three years but had been, in its last years, wracked by an economic downturn and severe labour unrest among miners in Cape Breton.

Rhodes ran on a Maritime Rights platform, promising to curtail federal influence and stop the exodus of people from the province. The Tories more than doubled their seats in the Nova Scotia House of Assembly, winning forty out of forty-three seats. An important factor in their victory was the failure of the governing Liberals to resolve a long strike by the province's coal miners. When Cape Breton coal miner William Davis was killed by company police in a confrontation on June 11, voters looked to the Tories for solutions. Rhodes engineered a settlement of the dispute and appointed a royal commission. The new government later introduced pensions for teachers and allowances for widowed mothers.

Abolition of the Legislative Council
The Legislative Council, the province's appointed upper house, dated from 1838 and was meant to mimic the Imperial House of Lords. It had, however, been the source of constant criticism from 1870, and every government since 1878 had promised or at least supported its abolition. The Council had been normally sized at 21 members prior to confederation, and the British North America Act 1867 provided for the continuation of provincial constitutions. Failing to further specify anything on such constitutions, the Act left doubt as to whether the Council was therefore limited to the customary 21 members, the 18 members actually empanelled at the time of the Act, or as many members as the Sovereign, however represented in Nova Scotia, wished. Further statutes of the provincial constitution continued this confusion. Similar equivocation existed as to whether appointments to the Council were for life or the mere pleasure of the Sovereign.

Rhodes abolished the Council but first had to go to the Judicial Committee of the Privy Council to obtain permission to appoint enough new members to the Council to secure a vote for its abolition. The Committee ruled that the Sovereign, represented by the Lieutenant-Governor, could appoint as many Councillors as desired and that Councillors served at pleasure.

Second term
The Rhodes government was re-elected in 1928 with a reduced majority. He returned to federal politics to become Minister of Fisheries under Prime Minister R.B. Bennett. From 1932 to 1935, he served as federal Finance Minister, and, despite the Great Depression, handed down austere budgets that increased taxes and reduced spending.

Senate and later life
He was appointed to the Senate of Canada three months before the 1935 federal election that routed Bennett's government. He remained a Senator until his death in 1942 in Ottawa. He is buried in Ottawa's Beechwood Cemetery.

On July 12, 1905, he married Mary Grace Pipes, daughter of William Thomas Pipes, Rhodes' law partner and Premier of Nova Scotia from 1882 to 1884. They had one son, Edgar Nelson, and one daughter, Helen Sybil.

Electoral Record

References

Works cited

External links

Edgar Nelson Rhodes fonds, Library and Archives Canada

1877 births
1942 deaths
Canadian Baptists
Canadian Ministers of Finance
Canadian senators from Nova Scotia
Canadian people of English descent
Conservative Party of Canada (1867–1942) MPs
Conservative Party of Canada (1867–1942) senators
Members of the House of Commons of Canada from Nova Scotia
Members of the King's Privy Council for Canada
Progressive Conservative Association of Nova Scotia MLAs
People from Amherst, Nova Scotia
Premiers of Nova Scotia
Speakers of the House of Commons of Canada
Unionist Party (Canada) MPs
Nova Scotia political party leaders